is a 2003 manic shooter by Cave and published by AMI. It is the spiritual successor to ESP Ra.De. and is followed by Espgaluda II.

Gameplay

Espgaluda is an arcade game which involves firing bullets and lasers at enemies. A shield attack can be used, but it runs on a limited quantity which is indicated by a gauge at the bottom of the screen. The player earns extra lives at 4 million and 14 million points, or by obtaining the "L" extend item in the third stage.

If the player collides with a bullet, the guard barrier activates. The automatic guard barrier will consume two segments from the gauge, but will only last as long as one segment would. If the gauge contains less than two segments, the guard barrier will still activate, and whatever remains in the gauge will be consumed. If the gauge is empty at the time of the collision, the player will lose a life. The player will not collect any green gems when enemies are destroyed, regardless of the current gem count.

Kakusei mode
In Kakusei (Awakening) mode, the gem counter begins to drain, and all enemy bullets become purple. While the gem counter is above zero, enemies and projectiles will slow down. Destroyed enemies' bullets turn into gold, and the player's gem counter is decreased by 10. Each bullet converted into gold carries a multiplier which increases until it reaches "x100". When the gem counter reaches zero, the player goes into "over-mode". In over-mode, bullets become red and begin to travel faster than their normal speed. Red bullets will not be converted to gold. Although the bullet speed changes in Kakusei mode, the rate at which they are fired remains the same. In kakusei mode, the fighter's gender is altered. Chihiro and Black retain their shot modes and cannot enter kakusei.

Guard barrier
When the guard barrier is engaged, the player fires a powerful laser, and is momentarily invincible. The guard barrier gauge is divided into 4 segments. Tapping the C button will use up an entire segment (one quarter of the gauge), but holding the C button can use up more than one segment depending on how long it is held. The C button may be released mid-segment, which may result in there being less than one segment remaining in the gauge. In this case, tapping the C button will use what is left in the gauge, but the guard barrier will last as long as an entire segment would have. The guard barrier forms a large green aura around the player, and any bullets that come into contact with this aura will disappear.

Fighters
Ageha: Concentrated forward shots. In Kakusei mode, the fighter moves faster with reduced horizontal sway when firing shot, slower when firing the beam.
Tateha: Wide angle forward shots. In Kakusei mode, the fighter moves faster when firing shots, slower when firing the beam.
Chihiro: Arrange mode fighter, PlayStation 2 only. It is basically Irori Mimasaka from ESP Ra.De.
Black: Arrange mode fighter, PlayStation 2 only. It is basically JB-5th from ESP Ra.De.

Miscellaneous commands
Holding A and B buttons for over 0.5 seconds when pressing START reverses the full-auto button setting. Holding C and D buttons for over 0.5 seconds when pressing START swaps the functions of C and D buttons. Both commands affect Players 1 and 2, and only affect the current game credit. If both players try to use a command, both commands are accepted.

Development 

Espgaluda was produced by Kenichi Takano and directed by Tsuneki Ikeda, co-founders of Cave whose previous works include the DonPachi series. Ikeda also served as co-programmer alongside Takashi Ichimura. Akira Wakabayashi, Hideki Nomura, Hiroyuki Tanaka and Kengo Arai also acted as co-designers. Artist Tsukasa Kado was responsible for both world building and character designs. The soundtrack was composed by "SOU1" under supervision of Toshiaki Tomizawa, another co-founder of Cave. The team recounted its creation process and history through various publications.

Release 
Espgaluda was first released in arcades by AMI in November 2003. On March 15, 2004, a soundtrack album containing music from the game was published in Japan by Cave. On June 17 of the same year, a conversion for the PlayStation 2 was developed and published by Arika in Japan. The PlayStation 2 version included different modes such as arcade, simulation, arrange, and a walkthrough DVD video featuring high-level replays. In arcade mode, players can configure screen orientation and other settings. Simulation mode simulates an arcade mode stage where players can practice of sections under pre-defined conditions. Arrange mode is a PlayStation 2-exclusive feature and introduces more aggressive enemy patterns, new playable characters, an arranged soundtrack, among other additions and gameplay changes.

In 2005, Espgaluda was split into two separate parts and distributed by Cave through the Gaesen Yokocho service for EZweb, i-mode and Yahoo Mobile phones. Both parts were later merged into a single release titled Espgaluda DX, featuring enhanced graphics and a special mode.

Reception 

Espgaluda garnered positive reception from critics who reviewed it as an import title, with the PlayStation 2 conversion being regarded by outlets like Kotaku Australia and TheGamer as one of the best shoot 'em ups on the console. According to Famitsu, the PlayStation 2 version sold over 10,125 copies in its first week on the market and approximately 17,755 copies were sold during its lifetime in Japan.

Famitsus four reviewers gave the PlayStation 2 conversion a positive outlook. Game Watchs Toyotomi Kazutaka praised the extra additions of the PlayStation 2 port such as arrange mode, as well as its "Kakusei" and guard barrier mechanics. Edge commended the PlayStation 2 release for its accessibility, "Kakusei" and guard barrier mechanics, scoring system and extra modes but criticized the loss of visual fidelity due to screen resolution differences. Consoles +s Kael also gave positive remarks to the PlayStation 2 version for its gameplay and music but criticized the short length. Hardcore Gaming 101s Craig Gabrielson noted its scoring system and accessibility in a positive light but criticized the visual variety in terms of stages and soundtrack.

Notes

References

External links 

  at Cave
  at Arika
 
 

2003 video games
Arcade games
Bullet hell video games
Cave (company) games
Cooperative video games
Japan-exclusive video games
Mobile games
Multiplayer and single-player video games
PlayStation 2 games
Science fiction video games
Shoot 'em ups
Vertically scrolling shooters
Video games developed in Japan
Video games featuring female protagonists